Joshua Ryan Evans (January 10, 1982 – August 5, 2002) was an American actor who became known for his role of Timmy Lenox in the soap opera Passions. Though he was 17 years old when Passions debuted, Evans had the appearance and voice of a small child due to achondroplasia, a form of dwarfism.

Early life and career
Born in Hayward, California, Evans began his career at age 12, appearing in various commercials. He made his film debut as a toddler in Baby Geniuses in 1999. The following year he played the role of the young Grinch (Jim Carrey's character) in How the Grinch Stole Christmas. He also appeared as General Tom Thumb in the A&E miniseries P.T. Barnum. Evans also had guest spots on Ally McBeal, 7th Heaven, and Poltergeist: The Legacy.

In 1999, Evans began portraying Timmy on the soap opera Passions. Evans' character was a doll that the evil witch Tabitha Lenox brought to life with magic. For his work on the series, he was nominated for a Daytime Emmy Award in 2000 and won two Soap Opera Digest Awards in 2000 and 2001.

The character of Timmy was intended to become an angel and remain a presence on the show, but this entire storyline was quickly rewritten after Evans' death to excise the character (although one already-filmed scene was eventually aired, showing Timmy in Heaven).

Death
On August 5, 2002, Evans died during a medical procedure in San Diego from complications related to a congenital heart condition. He was 20 years old. The death scene Evans had previously taped for Passions aired the same day that he died. The episode was dedicated to him.

Evans was cremated and his ashes interred in a niche at Forest Lawn Memorial Park in Hollywood Hills.

Filmography

Awards and nominations

References

External links

Josh Ryan Evans and Achondroplasia at About.com

1982 births
2002 deaths
20th-century American male actors
21st-century American male actors
Actors with dwarfism
American male child actors
American male film actors
American male soap opera actors
American male television actors
Burials at Forest Lawn Memorial Park (Hollywood Hills)
Male actors from California
People from Hayward, California